Erithyma cyanoplecta is a moth in the family Depressariidae. It was described by Edward Meyrick in 1914. It is found in Guyana.

The wingspan is 11–12 mm. The forewings are blackish with narrow indigo-blue-metallic transverse fasciae at one-fifth and before the middle, the second furcate (forked) towards the dorsum. There are two white dots on the costa at three-fifths and two-thirds, the first terminated beneath by a blue-metallic dot, a small ochreous subcostal spot between these. There is a transverse-linear white mark in the disc at three-fifths and the dorsum is tinged with ferruginous ochreous towards two-thirds. There is a violet-leaden-metallic patch extending over the termen and tornus. The hindwings are dark fuscous.

References

Moths described in 1914
Depressariinae